Samer Jundi (born 27 September 1996) is a Palestinian footballer who plays as a left back for West Bank Premier League club Hilal Al-Quds and the Palestine football team.

Club career
In summer 2016 Jundi signed to Hapoel Ashdod from Liga Gimel (the fifth league) there played two season, there promoted with club two leagues row.

International career
On 8 June 2022 Jundi made his national team debut on 8 June 2022, in a 2023 AFC Asian Cup qualifier game against Mongolia.

Honours
 Hapoel Ashdod
Liga Gimel: 2016–17
Liga Bet: 2017–18

 Hilal Al-Quds
West Bank Premier League: 2018–19

References

External links
 
 
 

1996 births
Living people
Footballers from Jerusalem
Palestinian footballers
Hilal Al-Quds Club players
Hapoel Ashdod F.C. players
West Bank Premier League players
Palestine international footballers
Association football defenders